The 1997 season of the Liga de Fútbol Profesional Boliviano was the 40th season of top-tier football in Bolivia.

Torneo Apertura

Group A

Group B

Semifinals

Final

Torneo Clausura

Group A

Group B

Final stage

Play-offs

Copa Conmebol 

Real Santa Cruz qualified for the 1997 Copa Conmebol.

Promotion/relegation 

Destroyers remain at first level; Club Real Potosí won promotion

Title

See also 
 Bolivia national football team 1997

Notes

References 
 RSSSF Page

Bolivian Primera División seasons
Bolivia
1997 in Bolivian football